Lola Pashalinski is an American theatre artist known for her work as a founding member of Charles Ludlam's Ridiculous Theatrical Company.

Early life 
Born Regina Hirsch in Brooklyn, New York, Pashalinki's  father was an insurance salesman. She spent her young adulthood "bounc[ing] around from odd job to odd job 'mostly in publishing' and briefly attended college before dropping out."

Career 
Pashalinski became involved in theatre as an assistant director with John Vaccaro's Playhouse of the Ridiculous, a resident company at La MaMa Experimental Theatre Club, during the 1960s. She left the Playhouse of the Ridiculous with Ludlam when he and John Vaccarro had a disagreement during rehearsals for Conquest of the Universe in 1967.

Ludlam then founded his Ridiculous Theatrical Company, and Pashalinski was a founding member, working with the company from its establishment in 1967 until 1980. During those years, she appeared in 17 of the company's productions, including as Lola Lola in Corn (1973), Brunhilde in Der Ring Gott Farblonjet (1977), and Miss Cubbidge in Bluebeard (1970). Black-Eyed Susan, Mario Montez, and John Brockmeyer also performed in that production of Bluebeard, which took place at La MaMa.  Mary Brecht and Leandro Katz did design for the production. She also performed alongside Black-Eyed Susan, Brockmeyer, and Ethyl Eichelberger in Eichelberger's Phedre and Oedipus at La MaMa in 1977.

After leaving the Ridiculous Theatrical Company, Pashalinski appeared in a range of theatrical productions and in film and television. In 1981, she played the jester Trinculo in The Tempest, directed by Lee Breuer at Central Park's Delacorte Theater. She then worked with Richard Foreman, appearing in his 1983 production of Egyptology (My Head Was a Sledgehammer) at The Public Theater and his 1987 production of Film is Evil, Radio Is Good at New York University's Tisch School of the Arts. She performed in Tom Eyen's Give My Regards to Off-Off-Broadway at La MaMa in 1987.

She also worked several times with director/choreographer David Gordon, appearing in his 1983 collaboration with JoAnne Akalitis and Philip Glass, The Photographer, at the Brooklyn Academy of Music, his 1992 production of The Mysteries And What's So Funny at the Joyce Theater, also with music by Glass, and his 1996 production of Punch and Judy Get Divorced. In 1999, she portrayed Gordon in his Autobiography of a Liar at Danspace Project.<ref>"1999 - Autobiography of a Liar" Archiveography (Under Construction"</ref>

She also appeared in film and television, including as the psychiatrist in Mary Harron's I Shot Andy Warhol, as Narc in Peter Sellar's The Cabinet of Dr. Ramirez, as Mona Black in Extremely Loud and Incredibly Close, as Hedy Wormenhoven on One Life to Live, and in smaller roles in All Good Things, The Days and Nights of Molly Dodd, and The Equalizer.

In 1999, she and her partner Linda Chapman performed in a play they wrote called Gertrude & Alice: A Likeness to Loving, based on the relationship between Gertrude Stein and Alice B. Toklas. "I've always loved Gertrude Stein and felt that as a gay woman, I understood her in a way that many biographers did not,"  Pashalinski told journalist Simi Horowitz for a profile published in Backstage in 2005. "I wanted to explode the myth of what Stein was about... and the play gave me the chance to work with Linda." Pashalinksi again portrayed Stein in 2022, in performance artist John Kelly's Underneath the Skin at La MaMa.

 Awards 
Pashalinski won Obie Awards for Distinguished Performance by an Actress for her performances in the Ridiculous Theatrical Company productions Corn (1973) and Der Ring Gott Farblonjet (1977), and for her performance in Gertrude & Alice (2000).

 Theater 

 Film 

 Television 

 References 
Notes

Further reading
 Katz, Leandro, Bedlam Days: The Early Plays of Charles Ludlam and The Ridiculous Theatrical Company'',

External links 
 "Bluebeard" The seduction of Miss Cubbidge, audio and photographs by Leandro Katz (1970) (Vimeo)

Living people
Year of birth missing (living people)
20th-century American actresses
Actresses from New York City
American film actresses
American stage actresses
Obie Award recipients
People from Brooklyn
21st-century American women